The clover mite (Bryobia praetiosa) is a species of mite.

Description
They are reddish brown; the younger ones and the eggs are a bright red. They are extremely common in late spring in North America.

Ecology
Clover mites are polyphagous, feeding on a wide range of plants, including "lawn grasses, ornamental flowers, clover, dandelion, shepherd's purse, strawberry, daffodil, Salvia, Alyssum, and primrose". They are especially numerous in lawns with a heavy growth of succulent, well-fertilized grass. They do not cause any apparent harm to turf grass, but their feeding activity can turn the grass a silvery color and may stipple plants when heavy populations are present.

Clover mites reproduce their eggs do not need to be fertilized and are entirely female. Females lay about 70 eggs each.

They generally enter houses close to thick vegetation and can infiltrate houses in very large numbers through cracks and small openings around windows and doors. Whether indoors or outside, clover mites are found more commonly in sunny areas than in darker areas. If squashed, they leave a characteristic red stain caused by their pigmentation.

Clover mites are not harmful to humans, pets, or furniture.

References

External links 

Trombidiformes
Animals described in 1835
Arachnids of South America